The RBC Heritage, known for much of its history as the Heritage Classic or simply the Heritage, is a PGA Tour event in South Carolina, first played  in 1969. It is currently played in mid-April, the week after The Masters in Augusta, Georgia.

The venue for its entire existence has been the Harbour Town Golf Links at the Sea Pines Resort on Hilton Head Island. The Harbour Town course, which frequently appears on several "Best Courses" lists, was designed by famed golf course architect Pete Dye, with assistance from Jack Nicklaus. In 1972, the first two rounds were played on both the Harbour Town Golf Links and the Ocean course at Sea Pines, with the final two rounds at Harbour Town.

Originally played in late November, it moved to mid-September in 1973, March in 1974, and April in 1983. The inaugural champion in 1969 was forty-year-old Arnold Palmer, his first win in over a year. Course co-designer Nicklaus won in 1975,  two weeks before his fifth Masters win. Davis Love III leads with five victories in the event, Hale Irwin and Stewart Cink have three, while seven others have won twice.

From 1987 through 2010, it was sponsored either by MCI (under both the "MCI" and "WorldCom" names) or its eventual purchaser, Verizon. The tournament operated without a title sponsor in 2011, and the Royal Bank of Canada has been the title sponsor of The Heritage since 2012. It is currently organized by The Heritage Classic Foundation.

Course

Invitational status
The Heritage is one of only five tournaments given "invitational" status by the PGA Tour, and consequently it has a reduced field of only 132 players (as opposed to most full-field open tournaments with a field of 156 players).  The other four tournaments with invitational status are the Arnold Palmer Invitational, the Charles Schwab Challenge, the Memorial Tournament, and the Genesis Invitational.  Invitational tournaments have smaller fields (between 120 and 132 players), and have more freedom than full-field open tournaments in determining which players are eligible to participate in their event, as invitational tournaments are not required to fill their fields using the PGA Tour Priority Ranking System.  Furthermore, unlike full-field open tournaments, invitational tournaments do not offer open qualifying (aka Monday qualifying).

Field
The field consists of 132 players invited using the following criteria:
 RBC Heritage winners prior to 2000 and in the last five years
 U.S. Open or PGA Championship winners prior to 2005 playing 15 events in prior year
 The Players Championship and major championship winners in the last five years
 The Tour Championship and World Golf Championships winners in the past three years
 Winners of the Arnold Palmer Invitational and Memorial Tournament in the past three years
 Prior year U.S. Amateur winner (if still amateur)
 Winner FedEx Cup in the last five years
 Playing member of last named U.S. Ryder Cup team; current PGA Tour members who were playing members on last named European Ryder Cup team, U.S. Presidents Cup team, and International Presidents Cup team
 Top 50 Official World Golf Ranking through two weeks prior to the commitment deadline
 8 sponsors exemptions – 2 from Korn Ferry Tour finals, 2 members not otherwise exempt, and 4 unrestricted
 Commissioner exemption - 2 foreign players
 PGA Section (Carolinas) champion/player of the year
 Career Money Exemption
 Life members
 Top 125 from prior year's FedEx Cup points list, including top 125 (medical)
 Members in the top 125 non-member category whose non-WGC points equal or exceed the points by the player finishing in 125th on the prior year FedEx Cup points list
 Tournament winners (PGA Tour eligibility category 10)
 Top 20 on current FedEx Cup points list through Friday prior to the tournament
 Next five available players not otherwise eligible from current year's FedEx Cup points list
 Remaining positions filled using standard PGA Tour eligibility ranking after top 125 non-member category

Playing history
The tournament has been played in the month of
 November (1969–72)
 September (1973)
 March (1974–82) - usually two weeks before the Masters Tournament.
 April (1983–2019, 2021–) - usually the week after the Masters Tournament.
 June (2020) - Originally scheduled for April, but eventually rescheduled to June due to the COVID-19 pandemic.

Winners

Note: Green highlight indicates scoring records.
Source

Multiple winners
Ten men have won this tournament more than once through 2021.

5 wins
Davis Love III: 1987, 1991, 1992, 1998, 2003
3 wins
Hale Irwin: 1971, 1973, 1994
Stewart Cink: 2000, 2004, 2021
2 wins
Johnny Miller: 1972, 1974
Hubert Green: 1976, 1978
Tom Watson: 1979, 1982
Fuzzy Zoeller: 1983, 1986
Payne Stewart: 1989, 1990
Boo Weekley: 2007, 2008
Jim Furyk: 2010, 2015

Highlights

 1969: Arnold Palmer wins the inaugural edition of the tournament. He finishes three shots ahead of Richard Crawford and Bert Yancey.
 1971: Future three-time U.S. Open Champion, Hale Irwin, makes Heritage his first ever PGA Tour victory. He beats Bob Lunn by one shot.
 1976: Hubert Green wins by five shots over Jerry McGee. It was Green's third consecutive win in as many weeks.
 1980: George Archer sets a PGA Tour record for fewest putts in a 72-hole tournament, 94. The previous mark was 99 set by Bob Menne. Kenny Knox would subsequently break Archer's record at the 1989 MCI Heritage Golf Classic.
 1984: Nick Faldo wins his first PGA Tour event by one shot over Tom Kite. He is the first Englishman to win on United States soil since Tony Jacklin at the 1972 Greater Jacksonville Open.
 1987: Davis Love III wins by one shot over Steve Jones. Jones had come to the 72nd hole leading by one but made a double bogey after his tee shot went out of bounds.
 1990: Payne Stewart becomes the first Heritage champion to successfully defend his title. He beats Larry Mize and Steve Jones in a sudden death playoff.
 1994: Hale Irwin collects his 20th overall and last PGA Tour win at Harbour Town. He wins by two shots over Greg Norman.
 1998: Davis Love III becomes the first four-time Heritage winner. He wins by seven shots over Glen Day. Day would avenge his loss the next season for his only PGA Tour win.
 2003: Davis Love III wins his fifth Heritage by defeating Woody Austin in a sudden death playoff. To get in the playoff, Love chipped in from off the green at the 72nd hole.
 2005: Peter Lonard wins by two shots over Darren Clarke, Jim Furyk, Billy Andrade, and Davis Love III. Clarke was tied for the lead when teeing off on the 72nd hole, but like Steve Jones did in 1987, he hit his tee shot out of bounds and made double bogey. David Frost breaks Mark Calcavecchia's record of 93 putts in a 72-hole tournament by hitting only 92 putts.
 2007 Boo Weekley chips in on the last two holes for his first ever PGA Tour victory. He wins by one shot over Ernie Els.
 2010: Jim Furyk defeats Brian Davis in a sudden death playoff. On the first playoff hole, Davis calls a two-shot penalty on himself after he touched a loose impediment in a hazard with his golf club.
 2013: A PGA Tour record-tying 91 players make the 36-hole cut,  (a record set at the 1981 Greater Hartford Open). Jesper Parnevik bogeyed the 18th hole, giving Parnevik and 21 additional golfers entry into the third round.

References

External links

Coverage on the PGA Tour's official site

PGA Tour events
Golf in South Carolina
Recurring sporting events established in 1969
MCI Communications
1969 establishments in South Carolina